IRES may refer to:

 Internal ribosome entry site
 IBM Retail Environment for SUSE, a Point-of-Sale operating system solution
 Irish Residential Properties REIT